Repubblica TV, formerly Repubblica Radio TV, was an Italian all-news television channel, related to the Italian newspaper la Repubblica and owned by Gruppo Editoriale L'Espresso.

Born on April 10, 2006, during the Italian general election, broadcasting news and weather bulletins and political programs from 10.00 AM to 12.00 AM and repeats from 9.00 PM to 12.00 PM, Monday to Friday.
During its test transmission was in simulcast with All Music. 
It closed on May 11, 2013.

See also
la Repubblica

External links
 

2006 establishments in Italy
Television channels and stations established in 2006
Television channels and stations disestablished in 2013
Mass media in Milan
Defunct television channels in Italy
GEDI Gruppo Editoriale
2013 disestablishments in Italy
La Repubblica